Darrel Wayne Akerfelds (June 12, 1962 – June 24, 2012) was a professional baseball pitcher. He also served as the bullpen coach of Major League Baseball's San Diego Padres, from  until his death.

Early life and career
Akerfelds graduated in 1980 from Columbine High School in Littleton, Colorado, and played baseball at the University of Arkansas and Mesa State College.

He was drafted by the Seattle Mariners in the first round with the seventh overall pick in the 1983 Major League Baseball Draft. Just over five months later, he was traded to Oakland, with whom he made his major league debut in 1986. He appeared in two games for the A's before being traded to the Indians in July 1987. He spent much of the 1987 season in Cleveland, appearing in 16 games, 13 as a starter, with a win–loss record of 2–6 and a 6.75 ERA.

Akerfelds' only full season in the majors came in 1990. He appeared in 71 games for the Phillies, all in relief. He had a 5–2 record with three saves and an ERA of 3.77.

Later career
Akerfelds started 1991 in the majors, but his ERA rose to 5.26, and he was returned to the minor leagues in July, where he was converted back into a starter. He started eleven games for the Scranton/Wilkes-Barre Red Barons, but his ERA rose to 6.32 at AAA. He was allowed to become a free agent after the season. After being signed by the Baltimore Orioles to start the  season, Akerfelds spent another few seasons in the minors, finishing his career in the California Angels' farm system in  without returning to the majors.

After his retirement as a player, Akerfelds spent eleven years as bullpen coach for the San Diego Padres.

Illness and death
In 2011, Akerfelds was revealed to be suffering from pancreatic cancer. Akerfelds died in Phoenix, Arizona, on June 24, 2012, from complications of the disease.

References

External links
, or CPBL
Darrel Akerfelds at SABR (Baseball BioProject)

1962 births
2012 deaths
American expatriate baseball players in Canada
American expatriate baseball players in Taiwan
Arkansas Razorbacks baseball players
Baseball players from Denver
Bellingham Mariners players
Buffalo Bisons (minor league) players
Cleveland Indians players
Colorado Mesa Mavericks baseball players
Colorado Springs Sky Sox players
Columbine High School alumni
Deaths from cancer in Arizona
Deaths from pancreatic cancer
Madison Muskies players
Major League Baseball bullpen coaches
Major League Baseball pitchers
Midland Angels players
Oakland Athletics players
Oklahoma City 89ers players
Philadelphia Phillies players
San Diego Padres coaches
Scranton/Wilkes-Barre Red Barons players
Syracuse Chiefs players
Tacoma Tigers players
Texas Rangers players
Vancouver Canadians players
Wei Chuan Dragons players